Jade River may refer to:

 Jade (river), a river in Lower Saxony
 Jade River (radar), a CW Radar used with the Bristol Bloodhound and English Electric Thunderbird surface to air missiles